Lithuanian book smugglers or Lithuanian book carriers smuggled Lithuanian language books printed in the Latin alphabet into Lithuanian-speaking areas of the Russian Empire, defying a ban on such materials in force from 1864 to 1904. In Lithuanian knygnešys literally means "the one who carries books".  Opposing imperial Russian authorities' efforts to replace the traditional Latin orthography with Cyrillic, and transporting printed matter from as far away as the United States to do so, the book smugglers became a symbol of Lithuanians' resistance to Russification.

History 

After the Polish-Lithuanian insurrection of 1863, the Russian Imperial government intensified its efforts to Russify the Lithuanian population and alienate it from its historic roots, including the Roman Catholic faith, which had become widespread during the years of the Polish–Lithuanian Commonwealth.

During the summer of 1863 Tsar Alexander II issued Temporary Rules for State Junior Schools of the Northwestern Krai, ruling that only Russian-language education would be allowed there. In 1864, the Governor General of the Vilnius Governorate, Mikhail Muravyov, ordered that Lithuanian language primers were to be printed only in the Cyrillic alphabet. Muravyov's successor, Konstantin Kaufman, in 1865 banned all Lithuanian-language use of the Latin alphabet. In 1866, the Tsar issued an oral ban on the printing or importing of printed matter in Lithuanian. Although formally, the order had no legal force, it was executed de facto until 1904. During this time, there were approximately fifty-five printings of Lithuanian books in Cyrillic.

Most of the Latin-alphabet Lithuanian-language books and periodicals published at the time were printed in Lithuania Minor and then smuggled into Lithuania. When caught, the book smugglers were punished by fines, banishment, and exile, including deportation to Siberia. Some were shot after crossing the border.

In 1867, Motiejus Valančius, the Bishop of Samogitia, began to covertly organize and finance this printing abroad and sponsored the distribution of Lithuanian-language books within Lithuania. In 1870, his organization was uncovered with the help of Prussian authorities, and five priests and two book smugglers were exiled to remote areas of Russia. Other book smugglers carried on his work.

During the final years of the ban, an estimated 30,000 to 40,000 books were smuggled in annually. About one-third of them were seized by authorities. Lithuanian books reached every settlement in Lithuania, and many legal institutions served as undercover transfer points for the books. A number of secret organizations distributed the books throughout Lithuania, including , Atgaja, Teisybė, Prievarta, Aušrinė, Atžala, Lizdas, Akstinas, Spindulys, Svirplys, Žiburėlis, Žvaigždė, and Kūdikis.

In East Prussia since 1864 up to 1896, more than 3 500 000 copies of publications in Lithuanian language was published: about 500 000 primers, more than 300 000 scientific secular editions, 75 000 newspapers and other types of publications.

The ban's lack of success was recognized by the end of the 19th century, and in 1904, under the official pretext that the minorities within the Russian Empire needed to be pacified after the failure in the Russo-Japanese War, the ban on Lithuanian-language publications was lifted.

In 1905, soon after the ban was lifted, one of the book smugglers, opened his own bookstore in Panevėžys. This bookstore is still operational, and a chain of bookstores operates in Lithuania under his name.

This historical episode was widely suppressed during the years when Lithuania was occupied by the Soviet Union.

Book smuggler societies

Remembrance 

The book smugglers were an important part of the Lithuanian National Revival. After the dissolution of the Soviet Union, book smugglers were honored in Lithuania with museums, monuments, and street names. A statue dedicated to "The Unknown Book Smuggler" stands in Kaunas. Special relationship of Lithuanians and the book is still seen in the highly popular Vilnius Book Fair. It is also important to remember that Lithuanian book smugglers helped shape the future. They stood tall for their country and is now honored in many places still. 

Book smuggler Jurgis Bielinis, who created a secret distribution network for banned Lithuanian books, was born on 16 March 1846, and this date is commemorated in Lithuania as the Day of the Book Smugglers (Knygnešio diena).

In 1988, the Lithuanian Knygnešiai Association was established at the Lithuanian Culture Foundation. Among its goals was to collect information about all Lithuanian book smugglers and printers. , four volumes titled Knygnešys were printed. In 1997, the "" was unveiled at the Vytautas the Great War Museum. and in 1998 a book Šimtas knygnešių. Knygnešių sienelės vardai ("One Hundred Books Smugglers. Names on the Book Smugglers' Wall") was published.

During 1959–2000 there was a magazine named  which provided information about (modern) books and book publishers.

In 2018 London Book Fair the tactics of Knygnešiai was used to distribute books of the Lithuanian authors and spread the information about the Lithuanian pavilion.

See also 
Samizdat
Lithuanian National Revival
Morta Zauniūtė

Bibliography 
 Ruseckas, Petras (1992–1997) Knygnešys : 1864–1904 (Book-smuggler: 1864–1904) (3 vols.) Valstybinis leidybos centras, Vilnius,  (Volumes 1 & 2, reprint, originally published: Spaudos fondas, Kaunas, 1926–1928) (in Lithuanian);
 Merkys, Vytautas (1994) Knygnešių laikai: 1864–1904 (The era of the book-smugglers: 1864–1904) Valstybinis leidybos centras, Vilnius,  (in Lithuanian);
 Merkys, Vytautas (1994) Draudžiamosios lietuviškos spaudos kelias: 1864–1904: informacinė knyga (The path of the banned Lithuanian press: 1864–1904: An information book) Vilnius: Mokslo ir enciklopedijų leidykla, Vilnius,  (in Lithuanian);
  Kaluškevičius, Benjaminas and Žemaitytė-Narkevičienė, Ona (1998) Šimtas knygnešių: knygnešių sienelės vardai (One Hundred Book Carriers: The Names on the Book Carriers Wall) Lietuvos kultūros fondas, Lietuvos Knygnešio draugija, Vilnius,  (in Lithuanian);

References

External links 
 Statue entitled Knygnešys by Juozas Zikaras in Kaunas.
 Booksmugglers
 Knygnešiai / Smugléirí Leabhar a 2010 Lithuanian-Irish historical documentary.
 Knygnešys a 2011 feature film created by director Jonas Trukanas.

 
History of Lithuania (1795–1918)
History of the Lithuanian language
Politics of the Russian Empire